Claude Poole is an American former Negro league outfielder who played in the 1940s.

Poole made his Negro leagues debut in 1945 for the New York Black Yankees, and played for New York again in 1946 and 1948. In 31 recorded games, he posted 15 hits, including one home run, in 71 plate appearances.

References

External links
 and Seamheads

Year of birth missing
Place of birth missing
New York Black Yankees players
Baseball outfielders